Paul Savary (born November 2, 1982) is a Swiss professional ice hockey player. He is currently playing with Lausanne HC of the Swiss National League A.

Savary participated at the 2010 IIHF World Championship as a member of the Switzerland men's national ice hockey team.

References

External links

1982 births
Living people
Lausanne HC players
Swiss ice hockey forwards
People from Morges
Sportspeople from the canton of Vaud